The 9K115 Metis (NATO reporting name AT-7 Saxhorn) is a man-portable, tube launched, SACLOS wire-guided anti-tank guided missile of the Soviet Union. It is considered the Soviet counterpart to the American M47 Dragon ATGM.

The relatively small 9K115 missile was generally underpowered compared to contemporary armored threats, and consequently it was little-exported and little used in combat.

Development
The missile was developed by the Tula KBP.

During the 1980s, an upgraded version of the missile was developed—the Metis-M 9M131 (sometimes labelled Metis-2). Fired from the same launcher, the new missile is much larger and heavier, with an increased range and a larger warhead. The NATO designation for this missile is AT-13 Saxhorn-2.

History
The missile was introduced into the Soviet Army in 1979 to supplement the 9K111 Fagot at company level. The system is lighter than the Fagot system, due to a less complicated tripod launcher and a lighter missile.

In Russian service, the Metis is deployed with motor rifle companies, with three launchers per company. The missile is operated by a two-man team; the gunner carries the 9P151 launching post and one missile, his assistant carries an additional three missiles. The AT-7 can be operated by one man if needed.

The export prices of the missile and firing post in 1992 were:
 9M131 Missile $13,500
 9P151 Firing post $70,000

Models
 9K115 (NATO: AT-7 Saxhorn) – Entered service in 1979.
 9K115-2 Metis-M (NATO: AT-13 Saxhorn-2)

Description
The missile is fired from the 9P151 launching post, which has a simple tripod for support. It can also be fired from the shoulder, but this apparently requires more skill on the part of the operator. The launching post weighs . The missile is launched from the tube by a booster rather than the gas generator used on the 9K111 Fagot system, despite both missiles being designed by the same design bureau. The 9S816 guidance system is powered by a thermal battery attached to the launch tube shortly before launch and the missile itself is remotely powered along the guidance wires.

The missile can be launched from an enclosed space, such as a building or cave, but requires at least  behind the launcher, and a total internal volume of at least .

The missile's warhead is a single HEAT shaped charge that can penetrate 460 mm of armor.

Operators

Current operators
 
 Metis-M1
 
 
 
 
 
 
 
 
  (Luhansk People's Republic)
 
 
  (Houthis)

Former operators
 
 
  – Retired.

References

 Hull, A.W., Markov, D.R., Zaloga, S.J. (1999). Soviet/Russian Armor and Artillery Design Practices 1945 to Present. Darlington Productions. .

External links

 AT-7 & AT-13 at FAS.org

Anti-tank guided missiles of the Cold War
Anti-tank guided missiles of the Soviet Union
Anti-tank guided missiles of Russia
KBP Instrument Design Bureau products
Military equipment introduced in the 1970s